Thirteen is the thirteenth solo album by Australian singer/songwriter James Reyne. (11 studio albums and 2 live albums). released on 16 March 2012. Reyne co-wrote tracks with producer Scott Kingman and Tim Henwood (from The Androids). The album covers a range of musical styles.

Reyne toured the album to positive reviews.

Themes
Thirteen shares something with novelists such as John Cheever and Richard Ford, the notion that middle age, not youth, is when a person can make the most dangerous, destructive decisions in their life. Reyne said, "There's a desperation that comes with middle age, and there are things that can go wrong. The record is autobiographical - there's a song called "The Drone" that's written about me. It's a joke, but kind of true. I'm a big fan of Warren Zevon and Randy Newman, and they've always been frank in what they sang about while having fun with the phrases."

Review
Stack Records gave the album 4.5 out of 5, saying "Thirteen could have been a self-indulgent mess. Instead, it’s perhaps Reyne’s finest solo album and one of the year’s best." adding "[it] is the sound of an artist coming to terms with his past."

Track listing
CD/DD 
 "English Girls"
 "Capsize"
 "Whatcha Gonna Do About It?"
 "Good Clean Fun"
 "Stop"
 "Mitterrand's Last Meal"
 "The Drone"
 "Digging A Hole In The Pines"
 "The P.A.'s P.A."
 "I Could Have Been Your Dad, Son"
 "Tijuana Bibles"

Release history

References

2012 albums
MGM Records albums
James Reyne albums